Latin pronunciation, both in the classical and post-classical age, has varied across different regions and different eras. As the respective languages have undergone sound changes, the changes have often applied to the pronunciation of Latin as well.

Latin still in use today is more often pronounced according to context, rather than geography. For a century, Italianate (perhaps more properly, modern Roman) Latin has been the official pronunciation of the Catholic Church due to the centrality of Italy and Italian, and this is the default of many singers and choirs. In the interest of Historically informed performance some singers of Medieval, Renaissance and Baroque music adopt the pronunciation of the composer's period and region.   While in Western university classics departments the reconstructed classical pronunciation has been general since around 1945, in the Anglo-American legal professions the older style of academic Latin still survives.

The following table shows the main differences between different regions with the International Phonetic Alphabet. This is far from a complete listing and lacks the local variations exhibited through centuries, but is intended to give an outline of main characteristics of different regions.

In many countries, these regional varieties are still in general use in schools and churches. The Italian model is increasingly advocated in ecclesiastical contexts and now widely followed in such contexts by speakers of English, sometimes with slight variations.

See also
 Authentic performance
 Ecclesiastical Latin
 Latin spelling and pronunciation

Specific languages 
 Traditional English pronunciation of Latin
 Traditional German pronunciation of Latin 
 Traditional French pronunciation of Latin

Other languages 
 
 Pronunciation of Ancient Greek in teaching
 Sino-Xenic pronunciations

Further reading 
 Benedictines Of Solesmes, ed. Liber Usualis with introduction and rubrics in English. Great Falls, Montana: St. Bonaventure Publ., 1997.
 Copeman, Harold. Singing in Latin. Oxford, UK: Harold Copeman (publisher), revised edition 1992.
 McGee, Timothy J. with A G. Rigg and David N. Klausner, eds. Singing Early Music. Bloomington and Indianapolis: Indiana UP, 1996.

References 

Forms of Latin
Phonology
Language_comparison